AmFIRST Real Estate Investment Trust is one of the largest Malaysia-based commercial REIT with exposure to office, retail and hotel sector in the Klang Valley and Cyberjaya. AmFIRST currently manages eight properties, of which three are located within the Kuala Lumpur Golden Triangle area and one each in Petaling Jaya, Kelana Jaya and Subang Jaya
and two in Cyberjaya. AmFIRST currently manages over 2.5 million sq ft of real estate space.

Corporate information

Properties

References 

 http://www.amfirstreit.com.my/

Real estate investment trusts
Investment banks in Malaysia